= Piotr Franaszek =

- Born: 12 May 1955 (age 71)
- Occupation: Historian

Piotr Franaszek (born 12 May 1955) is a historian, professor at the Jagiellonian University, member of the Council of the Institute of National Remembrance (IPN) from 2016 and deputy chairman of the IPN Council from 2019.

== Biography ==
In 1979 he graduated with master's degree in history from the Jagiellonian University. In 1988 he obtained doctorate upon dissertation Myśl naukowo-techniczna w galicyjskim górnictwie naftowym w drugiej połowie XIX w. (do roku 1918), supervised by Helena Madurowicz-Urbańska. In 1996 he obtained habilitation. He supervised eight doctoral dissertations. From 1999 to 2002 he was deputy director of the Institute of History of the Jagiellonian University. From 2002 to 2008 he was director of that institute.

He was appointed as a member of the Institute of National Remembrance (IPN) Council by a resolution of the Sejm on 23 June 2016. In May 2019 he was elected deputy chairman of the council for its fourth term, which began in June 2019. He served as Deputy Chairman of the council during its fifth term. Following elections held on in June 2021, he was again elected deputy chairman of the IPN Council.

== Works ==
- Myśl techniczna w galicyjskim wiertnictwie naftowym w latach 1860–1918. Kraków. 1991.
- Informator statystyczny do dziejów społeczno-gospodarczych Galicji: rolnictwo w dobie autonomii. Cz. 1, Produkcja roślinna. Kraków-Warszawa. 1992.
- Produkcja roślinna w Galicji doby autonomicznej. Kraków. 1995.
- Informator statystyczny do dziejów społeczno-gospodarczych Galicji: zdrowie publiczne w Galicji w dobie autonomii. Kraków. 2001.
- Zdrowie publiczne w Galicji w dobie autonomii (wybrane problemy). Kraków. 2002.
- Collegium Witkowskiego. Kraków. 2014.

=== As editor ===
- Celem nauki jest człowiek... Studia z historii społecznej i gospodarczej ofiarowane Helenie Madurowicz-Urbańskiej. Kraków. 2000.
- O nowoczesnym zarządzaniu majątkiem – rady dla potomnych Karola Belina Brzozowskiego: źródła do dziejów gospodarstwa ziemiańskiego na Kresach w XIX wieku. Kraków. 2005.
- Ausgewählte Probleme zur Geschichte der polnischen Landwirtschaft im 19. und 20. Jahrhundert. Kraków. 2005.
- Problemy cywilizacyjnego rozwoju Białorusi, Polski, Rosji i Ukrainy od końca XVIII do XXI wieku. Kraków. 2007.
- Stłamszona nauka? Inwigilacja środowisk akademickich i naukowych przez aparat bezpieczeństwa w latach siedemdziesiątych i osiemdziesiątych XX wieku. Warszawa. 2010.

== Accolades ==
- Knight's Cross of the Order of Polonia Restituta (2022)
